George Russell Sextet in K.C. (subtitled Original Swinging Instrumentals and sometimes referred to by that name) is an album by George Russell recorded (despite the title) in a New York studio and originally released on Decca in 1961. The album contains performances by Russell with Don Ellis, David Baker, Dave Young, Chuck Israels and Joe Hunt. The Allmusic review by Ken Dryden states that "George Russell was at a creative peak in the early '60s as he recorded one memorable small-group session after another".

Reception

Down Beat critic Richard B. Hadlock wrote in his June 21, 1962 review: "Russell, a kind of intellectual Thelonious Monk, has a remarkable little band that seems to get better with the passing months. It is about the most impressive assemblage of fresh young talent to be heard as a working unit anywhere."

Track listing
All compositions by George Russell except as indicated
 "War Gewesen" (David Baker) - 6:19    
 "Rhymes" (Carla Bley) - 4:27    
 "Lunacy" (Baker) - 7:15    
 "Sandu" (Clifford Brown) - 11:01    
 "Tune Up" (Miles Davis) - 8:05    
 "Theme" - 3:14
Recorded February 23, 1961 in NYC

Personnel
George Russell: piano, arranger, conductor
Don Ellis: trumpet
David Baker: trombone
Dave Young: tenor saxophone
Chuck Israels: bass
Joe Hunt: drums

References

1961 albums
George Russell (composer) albums
Decca Records albums
Albums arranged by George Russell (composer)
Albums conducted by George Russell (composer)